Mohammed al-Duayf or Abu abd Allah Mohammad Al-murabit ben Abd as-Salam ben Ahmed ben Muhamad al-Duayyif al-Ribati (born Rabat, Morocco 1752) was a Moroccan writer. He is the author of Tarikh al Du'ayyif, a source on the life of Sultan Mohammed ben Abdallah (1757–1790).

Notes

References
Muhammad al-Du'ayf al-Ribati, Tarikh al- Du'ayf (Tarih al-Dawla al-Saida), revu et annoté par Ahmad.al-Amari, Rabat: Dar al-Maturat, 1986

1752 births
Year of death unknown
Writers from Rabat
18th-century Moroccan historians